Phyllis Jack Webstad is a Northern Secwepemc (Shuswap) author from the Stswecem'c Xgat'tem First Nation, and the creator of Orange Shirt Day, a day of remembrance marked in Canada later instated as the public holiday of National Day for Truth and Reconciliation. She is a First Nations residential school survivor. She has written multiple books, including a picture book depicting her experience with the Indian residential school system.

National Day for Truth and Reconciliation 

The inspiration for the Canadian public holiday National Day for Truth and Reconciliation, originally called Orange Shirt Day, came from Webstad, who shared her story at a St. Joseph Mission (SJM) Residential School Commemoration Project and Reunion event held in Williams Lake, British Columbia, in the spring of 2013. Webstad recounted her first day of residential schooling at six years old, when she was stripped of her clothes, including the new orange shirt her grandmother bought her, which was never returned. The orange shirt now symbolizes how the residential school system took away the indigenous identity of its students. It is held annually on September 30 as a national day of remembrance in Canadian communities, where people are encouraged to wear an orange shirt. It was elevated to a statutory holiday for federal employees by the Canadian government in 2021.

Orange Shirt Day exists as a legacy of the SJM Project, and September 30 signifies the time of year when Indigenous children were historically taken from their homes to residential schools. The official tagline of the day, "Every Child Matters", reminds Canadians that all peoples' cultural experiences are important.

In addition to simply wearing an orange shirt, Canadians are encouraged to learn more about the history of residential schools and their assimilation practices, drawing from Phyllis' experience in particular. For instance, many communities have held memorial walks, film screenings, and public lectures to raise awareness about Indigenous history. Accordingly, school boards across Canada have begun to use this event to teach children about the historic system.

She is profiled in Sean Stiller's 2021 documentary film Returning Home.

Books 
The Orange Shirt Story (2018)
Phyllis's Orange Shirt (2019)

Personal life

Early life 
Webstad is Northern Secwepemc (Shuswap) from the Stswecem'c Xgat'tem First Nation and was born on Dog Creek Reserve, near Williams Lake, British Columbia.

Adulthood 
Phyllis Webstad is married, and has one son, a step-son and five grandchildren.

References

External links 
orangeshirtday.org

Living people
21st-century Canadian women writers
Canadian women memoirists
21st-century memoirists
21st-century First Nations writers
First Nations women writers
Writers from British Columbia
1967 births
Indigenous Canadian women